Membrane Pro-Xaa carboxypeptidase (carboxypeptidase P, microsomal carboxypeptidase) is an enzyme. This enzyme catalyses the following chemical reaction

 Release of a C-terminal residue other than proline, by preferential cleavage of a prolyl bond

This is one of the renal brush border exopeptidases

References

External links 
 

EC 3.4.17